Lettau Peak is a triangular peak,  high,  west-northwest of Fogle Peak in the Royal Society Range of Victoria Land, Antarctica. It was named in 1992 by the Advisory Committee on Antarctic Names after Bernhard Lettau, Program Manager for Polar Ocean and Climate Sciences in the Office of Polar Programs, National Science Foundation, from 1976.

References

Mountains of Victoria Land
Scott Coast